Paul-Étienne Grandbois (1846 – September 18, 1907) was a physician and political figure in Quebec. He represented Témiscouata in the House of Commons of Canada from 1878 to 1896 as a Conservative member.

He was born in Ste-Philomène, Châteauguay County, Canada East and was educated at the Collège Saint-Sulpice, the Petit Séminaire de St. Therèse de Blainville and the Université Laval. In 1873, he married a Miss Pelletier. He served as government whip from 1885 to 1891. Granbois ran unsuccessfully for reelection to the House of Commons in 1896, 1900 and 1904.

References 
 
The Canadian parliamentary companion, 1891, AJ Gemmill

1846 births
1907 deaths
Members of the House of Commons of Canada from Quebec
Conservative Party of Canada (1867–1942) MPs